Epanastasis arenberorum is a moth in the animal family Autostichidae. It was described by László Anthony Gozmány in 1988. It is found in Tunisia.

References

Moths described in 1988
Epanastasis